Ping Tao Li (born 1936) is a Chinese botanist who co-authored articles in the Flora of China.

Publications
Loganiaceae, (co-author A J M Leeuwenberg) in Wu, Z. & Raven, P. Eds. Flora of China, Vol. 15, (1996), Science Press, Beijing, and Missouri Botanical Garden Press, St. Louis, USA.

References 

Botanists active in China
Botanists with author abbreviations
1936 births
Living people
20th-century Chinese botanists
Date of birth missing (living people)